Hadar Rubinstein (הדר רובינשטיין; born  April 11, 1967) is an Israeli former Olympic swimmer. She was born in Israel, and is Jewish.

Swimming career
Swimming for Israel at the age of 14 at the 1981 Maccabiah Games, she won gold medals in the women's 100 m butterfly with a time of 1:05.67, and in the women's 200 m butterfly (setting an Israeli record).

When she competed in the Olympics, she was 5–2.5 (159 cm) tall and weighed 115 lbs (52 kg).	

She competed for Israel at the 1984 Summer Olympics in Los Angeles, California, in swimming at the age of 17. Swimming in the Women's 400 metre freestyle she came in 21st with a time of 4:34.95, competing in the Women's 200 metre butterfly she came in 26th with a time of 2:22.78, and Swimming in the Women's 200 metre freestyle she came in 26th with a time of 2:12.32.

References

External links
 

Living people
Swimmers at the 1984 Summer Olympics
Maccabiah Games medalists in swimming
Maccabiah Games gold medalists for Israel
1967 births
Israeli female swimmers
Jewish swimmers
Competitors at the 1981 Maccabiah Games
Olympic swimmers of Israel